Ping King Tien (August 2, 1919 – December 27, 2017) was a Chinese-American electrical engineer and scientist, noted for his contributions to microwave amplifiers and integrated optical circuits.

Biography
Tien was born in Shangyu, Shaoxing, Chekiang (Zhejiang) province, China. He did his undergraduate studies in the National Central University in Nanjing (the predecessor of Nanjing University and Southeast University in Mainland China) and Shanghai Jiao Tong University. He received his B.S. in electrical engineering in 1942. Tien continued his study in the United States, and received his master's degree in 1948 and PhD in 1951 both from the Stanford University.

Tien then joined Bell Labs to work with John Robinson Pierce, eventually becoming head of Electronics Research (1959), Electron-Physics Research (1966), Micro-Electronics Research (1980), High Speed Electronics Research (1984), and fellow in the Photonics Research Laboratory (1989). He died in December 2017 at the age of 98.

Honors and awards
Tien has received several honors and awards, including:
 Elected Member of the United States National Academy of Sciences (in 1978)
 Elected Member of the United States National Academy of Engineering (in 1975)
 Elected Academician of the Academia Sinica (in 1988)
 Elected Fellow of the Institute of Electrical and Electronics Engineers
 Elected Fellow of the Optical Society of America
 Elected Member of the Third World Academy of Sciences
 Elected Foreign Member of the Chinese Academy of Engineering
 1979, IEEE Morris N. Liebmann Memorial Award "for contributions to integrated optics technology"

References 
 Correspondence, Proceedings of the IRE, volume 40, issue 6, pages 728-729. June 1952.

American electrical engineers
1919 births
2017 deaths
Fellow Members of the IEEE
Members of Academia Sinica
Members of the United States National Academy of Engineering
Members of the United States National Academy of Sciences
People from Shangyu
Scientists at Bell Labs
University of Shanghai for Science and Technology alumni
Stanford University alumni
Scientists from Shaoxing
Engineers from Zhejiang
Chinese emigrants to the United States
Southeast University alumni
National Chiao Tung University (Shanghai) alumni
Foreign members of the Chinese Academy of Engineering
TWAS fellows